Bouchercon is an annual convention of creators and devotees of mystery and detective fiction. It is named in honour of writer, reviewer, and editor Anthony Boucher; also the inspiration for the Anthony Awards, which have been issued at the convention since 1986. This page details Bouchercon XXXIV and the 18th Anthony Awards ceremony.

Bouchercon
The convention was held in Las Vegas, Nevada on October 16, 2003; running until the 19th. The event was chaired by Deen Kogan, founder of the Society Hill playhouse.

Special Guests
American Guest of Honor — James Lee Burke
International Guest of Honor — Ian Rankin
Fan Guests of Honor — Ann and Jeff Smith
Toastmaster — Lee Child
Memorial Honoree — Hal Rice
Contribution to the Field award — Janet Hutchings
Exemplary Body of Work award — Ruth Rendell

Anthony Awards
The following list details the awards distributed at the eighteenth annual Anthony Awards ceremony.

Novel award
Winner:
Michael Connelly, City of Bones

Shortlist:
Cara Black, Murder in the Sentier
Steve Hamilton, North of Nowhere
George Pelecanos, Hell to Pay
S. J. Rozan, Winter and Night

First novel award
Winner:
Julia Spencer-Fleming, In the Bleak Midwinter

Shortlist:
David Corbett, The Devil's Redhead
Libby Fischer Hellmann, An Eye for Murder
Jonathon King, The Blue Edge of Midnight
Eddie Muller, The Distance

Paperback original award
Winner:
Robin Burcell, Fatal Truth

Shortlist:
Jeff Abbott, Black Jack Point
Roberta Isleib, Six Strokes Under
P. J. Parrish, Paint it Black
Andy Straka, A Killing Sky

Short story award
Winner:
Marcia Talley, "Too Many Cooks", from Much Ado About Murder

Shortlist:
Lauren Haney, "Murder in the Land of Wawat", from The Mammoth Book of Egyptian Whodunnits
Clark Howard, "To Live and Die in Midland, Texas", from Ellery Queen's Mystery Magazine September / October 2002
Toni Kelner, "Bible Belt", from Ellery Queen's Mystery Magazine June 2002
Bob Truluck, "A Man Called Ready", from Measures of Poison

Critical / Non-fiction award
Winner:
Jim Huang, They Died in Vain: Overlooked, Underappreciated and Forgotten Mystery Novels

Shortlist:
Mike Ashley, The Mammoth Encyclopedia of Modern Crime Fiction
Jeffrey Marks, Intent To Sell: Marking the Genre Novel

Cover art award
Winner:
Michael Kellner; for Dennis McMillan, Measures of Poison

Shortlist:
Jennifer Harris & Melissa Farris; for Daniel Chavarria, The Eye of Cybele
Cheryl L. Cipriani; for Cara Black, Murder in the Sentier
Larry Rostant; for John Fusco, Paradise Salvage
Paul Buckley; for Andrea Camilleri, The Terracotta Dog

References

Anthony Awards
34
2003 in Nevada